Nikolaidis is a Greek surname of Pontic origin. It is a patronymic surname which literally means "the son of Nikolaos (Nicolaos)", equivalent to English Nicholson or Nixon, and can also be found transliterated as Nicolaidis or even Nicolaides. The feminine form is Nikolaidou but the less formal Nikolaidi can also be found in use as well.

Notable people with this surname include:

Alexandros Nikolaidis (born 1979), Greek Taekwondo athlete
Alexandros Nikolaidis (basketball) (born 2002), Greek basketball player
Andrej Nikolaidis (born 1974), Bosnian novelist and critic
Apostolos Nikolaidis (athlete) (1896-1980), Greek footballer and track athlete
Apostolos Nikolaidis (singer) (1938-1999), Greek singer
Demis Nikolaidis (born 1973), Greek footballer
Dimitris Nikolaidis (1922-1993), Greek actor
Efstratios Nikolaidis (born 1985), Greek Paralympic athlete
Elena Nikolaidi (1909-2002), Greek-American opera singer
Kalypso Nicolaïdis, Greek-French academic
Katerina Nikolaidou, Greek beach volleyball player
Kostas Nikolaidis, Greek footballer
Nikos Nikolaidis (1939-2007), Greek film director and script writer
Prodromos "Makis" Nikolaidis (born 1978), Greek basketball player
Sotiris "Sotos" Nikolaidis (born 1974), Greek basketball player
Theofilaktos Nikolaidis (born 1973), Greek footballer
Vera Nikolaidou, Greek parliament member

See also
 Apostolos Nikolaidis Stadium, stadium in Athens
 Nikolaou
 Nikolopoulos

Greek-language surnames
Surnames
Patronymic surnames
Surnames from given names